Kikki was the second attested ruler of the kingdom of Tabal in Anatolia, in what is now Turkey. He was the son of Tuwati I. He ruled around 837 BC and is attested by Assyrian sources.

References 

Hittite kings
9th-century BC rulers